Bibliotheca Anatomica is a Latin-language human anatomy text edited by Daniel Le Clerc (or Daniel LeClerc) and Jean-Jacques Manget, two physicians from Geneva. The work was published in Geneva by Sumptibus J. A. Chouët and Davidis Ritter.

Extending two folio volumes and encompassing almost all significant anatomical publications across the several decades prior to its publication, including the writings of Thomas Bartholin, Regnier de Graaf, William Harvey, Richard Lower, Marcello Malpighi, Jan Swammerdam, Raymond Vieussens, and Thomas Willis, Bibliotheca Anatomica is the most comprehensive collection of anatomical treatises produced in the 17th century.

References

External links
Bibliotheca anatomica - Open Library

1685 books
Anatomy books
Medical manuals

History of anatomy
17th-century Latin books